Canadian Woman Studies (French: Les cahiers de la femme) is a bilingual feminist quarterly academic journal covering women's studies. It is published by Inanna Publications and was established in 1978 by Marion Lynn and Shelagh Wilkinson. The current editor-in-chief is Luciana Ricciutelli.

External links
 

English-language journals
French-language journals
Feminist journals
Feminism in Canada
Publications established in 1978
Multilingual journals
Women's studies journals